Zúñiga is a Spanish surname originally from the Basque region of the country. Notable people with the surname include:

Adela Elizabeth Zúñiga (born 1942),  politician
Alejandro Zúñiga, Chilean judoka
Alonso de Ercilla y Zúñiga (1533–1594), Spanish nobleman, soldier and poet 
Alonso Zúñiga (born 1980), Chilean footballer
Álvaro Manrique de Zúñiga, marqués de Villamanrique (died 1590), Spanish nobleman and the seventh viceroy of New Spain
Andrés Zúñiga, Mexican television actor and singer
Antonio de Zúñiga (c.1458–1533), Prior of Castile, Spanish general and Viceroy of Catalonia
Arcadio Zúñiga y Tejeda (1858–1892), Mexican composer
Arturo Zúñiga (born 1982), Chilean politician
Baltasar de Zúñiga (1561–1622), Spanish diplomat, royal favourite and minister
Baltasar de Zúñiga, 1st Duke of Arión (1658–1727), Spanish viceroy of New Spain 
Bernardita Zúñiga (born 1983), Chilean model
Cristián Gutiérrez (soccer, born 1997) (born 1997), Chilean footballer
Daphne Zuniga (born 1962), American actress
David Zuniga, American wrestler
Diego de Zúñiga (1536–1597), Augustinian Hermit and academic
Diego Gutiérrez Zuñiga (born 1997), Canadian soccer player
Diego López de Zúñiga, 4th Count of Nieva (c. 1510–1564), Spanish viceroy of Peru
Dilan Zúñiga (born 1996), Chilean footballer
Enrique Zúñiga (born 1976), Mexican basketball player
Felipe de Zúñiga y Ontiveros (1717–1793), scientist of New Spain
Fernando Zúñiga (born 1968), Chilean-Swiss linguist
Francisca Fernández-Hall Zúñiga (1921–2002), Guatemalan engineer and diplomat
Francisco López de Zúñiga, 2nd Marquis of Baides (1599–1655), Spanish soldier, Royal Governor of Chile 
Francisco Zúñiga (1912–1998), Costa Rican and Mexican artist
Fulgencio Zúñiga (born 1977), Colombian boxer
Gaspar de Zúñiga, 5th Count of Monterrey (1560–1606), Spanish nobleman, ninth viceroy of New Spain 
Gerardo Flores Zúñiga (born 1986), Mexican footballer
Guillermo Zúñiga Martínez (1942–2015), Mexican politician
Hernaldo Zúñiga (born 1955), Nicaraguan singer
Íñigo López de Mendoza y Zúñiga (1476–1535), Castilian cardinal, archbishop of Burgos, bishop of Coria and abbot of Santa Maria de la Vid
Jabari Zuniga (born 1997), American football player
José Zúñiga (born 1965), Honduran–American actor
José de Züñiga (1755–?), Spanish settler in California
José Alfredo Zúñiga (born 1985), Mexican boxer
Juan Domingo de Zuñiga y Fonseca (1640–1716), Spanish military and political figure
Juan Camilo Zúñiga (born 1985), Colombian footballer
Juan Carlos Zuniga, Honduran mayor of San Pedro Sula
Julio Granda Zúñiga (born 1967), Peruvian chess player
 Kevin Zuniga( Born 1992), Graphic Design - Patterson, NY
Laura Zúñiga (born 1985), Mexican model and beauty queen
Luis de Requesens y Zúñiga (1528–1576), Spanish governor of the Netherlands
Maite Zúñiga (born 1964), Basque athlete
Manuel Zúñiga (born 1960), Spanish footballer
Mariana Zúñiga (born 2002), Chilean Paralympic archer
Mario Pérez Zúñiga (born 1982), Mexican footballer
Markos Moulitsas Zúñiga (born 1971), American political columnist and publisher
Martín Zúñiga (born 1970), Mexican footballer
Martín Eduardo Zúñiga (born 1993), Mexican footballer
Mauricio de Zúñiga (died 1816), Governor of Florida in 1812–13 and 1816
Miguel Sierra Zúñiga, Mexican politician
Nicolás Zúñiga y Miranda (1865–1925), Mexican eccentric 
Nigel Zúniga (born 1971), Honduran football player
Nonoy Zuñiga, Filipino singer
Olivia Zúñiga (1916–1992), Mexican poet, novelist, and essayist
Priscilla Zuniga (born 1990), American wrestler
Rafael Zuñiga (born 1963), Bolivian boxer
Ricardo Miranda Zuñiga (born 1971), Nicaraguan-American artist
Sara Chacón Zúñiga (1914–1998), first winner of the Miss Ecuador title
Sebastián Zúñiga (born 1990), Chilean footballer
Todd Zuniga (born 1975), American writer
Violeta Zúñiga (1933-2019), Chilean human rights activist
Xavier Azuara Zúñiga (born 1979), Mexican politician
Ysrael Zúñiga (born 1976), Peruvian footballer

Basque-language surnames